Bu Musa (Bū Mūsā) is a city and capital of Bumusa County, Hormozgan Province, Iran. At the 2006 census, its population was 1,705, in 456 families.

References 

Populated places in Abumusa County
Cities in Hormozgan Province